Tutenstein is an American animated television series, produced by Porchlight Entertainment for Discovery Kids based on the comics by Jay Stephens. The series premiered on November 1, 2003 and ended on October 11, 2008. It features young mummy Tutankhensetamun (based on real-life Tutankhamun and usually called "Tutenstein" as in the title) who is awakened about 3,000 years after his accidental death and now must face the fact that his kingdom is gone. The name is a portmanteau of Tutankhamun and Frankenstein.

Beginning in August 2020, Yippee TV, the current owners of the series, made the series officially available for streaming on YouTube.

In October 2022, it was announced that a reboot is currently in the works. It will have a completely new look.

Plot
Tutankhensetamun was an impulsive but kindhearted young Egyptian Pharaoh who lived a luxurious but short life. He died because back in Ancient Egypt he saved a friend of his from being smashed by rocks from a collapsing temple, so he himself was crushed to death. He carries the mighty Sceptre of Was, and the circumstances of his death are unknown at first.

In the 21st century, 12-year-old middle school student Cleo Carter accidentally witnesses his awakening after a bolt of lightning hits the mummified body of Tut that is on display at the local museum. She with her anthropomorphic pet cat Luxor must now help Tut to find his way around in the modern world. During the whole series, Set, god of disorder and violence, attempts to destroy Tut and gain possession of the Sceptre to become the ruler of all.

Production
ABN reported "with regard to the ongoing theme of ancient temples and history found in his animated shows Tutenstein and The Secret Saturdays, [Jay] Stephens quips, "I'm a nerd. I like reading about history and mythology. And the past is full of surprises." Stephens spent many years developing the show for television, coming up with the new setting and cast of characters that diverged significantly from the original comics. Stephens became the creative consultant of the show, with character designer Fil Barlow reinterpreting the look of the entire series. Barlow was the production designer until his contracted 20 episodes expired and was fired. His successor was his student, Thomas Perkins.

The production company, PorchLight Entertainment, which is based in Los Angeles, California, has won Emmys for the first and second seasons of the series. Irish TV production company Telegael, which is based in An Spidéal, Co Galway, also won an Emmy Award for the second season.

Characters

Note: The voice actors were credited under pseudonyms as the series was not approved by SAG-AFTRA until the movie "Clash of the Pharaohs".
 Tut Ankh En Set Amun ("Tutenstein") – Jeannie Elias (seasons 1-2), Donna Cherry (season 3)
 Cleo Carter – Crystal Scales (seasons 1-2), Leah Lynette (season 3)
 Luxor – Daran Norris (seasons 1-2), David Lodge (season 3)

Historical accuracy
Many of the gods portrayed in the series resemble their historical portrayals and all the Egyptian myths mentioned in the show are genuine. The Scepter of Was being portrayed as an all-purpose magic wand is fictional, though the Was itself is a genuine Egyptian symbol. Unlike Tutankhamun, who died at the age of 19, Tut (Tutahnkensetamun) died when he was 10. On the other hand, Tutenstein is drawn with a cleft lip, just like the real Tutankhamun. The ancient game senet did exist, but as no precise rules for the game have been preserved, the rules as shown in the series are not accurate. Egyptologist Dr. Kasia Szpakowska served as a consultant to the series.

Episodes

Critical reception
Common Sense Media gave the show a rating of 3 stars out of 5, saying "The character of Tut is amusing, with his combination of childishness and egotism, and his interaction with Cleo and Luxor can be quite funny. The resolutions of the stories are fairly predictable – Tut uses his powers for good to help his friends, and harmony is restored – but the situation is unusual enough to keep the show fresh." DVD Verdict said "To be fair, as a product of the Discovery Channel, the producers have tried something slightly different with Tutenstein. Its educational children's programming, the attempt of an educational station to compete with more popular stations. Each episode incorporates some educational tidbits: explaining aspects of ancient Egyptian mythology and history. Unfortunately, the learning gets a bit mixed up with all the other nonsense." The Sydney Morning Herald wrote "It's The Mummy for kids... There's no Brendan Fraser or Rachel Weisz here, but the humorous dialogue – and the inclusion of a talking cat – should be a winner among younger viewers."

Awards and nominations

|-
| 2004
| Tutenstein
| Daytime Emmy Award for Outstanding Special Class Animated Program
| 
|-
| 2006
| Tutenstein
| Daytime Emmy Award for Outstanding Special Class Animated Program
| 
|-
| 2007
| Tutenstein
| Daytime Emmy Award for Outstanding Special Class Animated Program
| 
|}

Broadcast
The series aired on Discovery Kids and premiered in the United States on November 1, 2003 (along with Kenny the Shark). A TV movie entitled Tutenstein: Clash of the Pharaohs aired on October 11, 2008, ending the series. After the series ended, reruns continued to air on The Hub until December 30, 2012.

In 2004 the series had its British terrestrial television debut on ITV – first as part of the Saturday morning children's programme Ministry of Mayhem, and later in a weekday afternoon slot on CITV, where it was one of the highest-rating shows for kids aged 4–15.

In August 2003, Jetix Europe acquired the show's television, home video and consumer products rights for Europe, Israel, India and French-speaking Africa. Thus, it premiered on european channels of the network one year later. It also aired on Nickelodeon and ABC in Australia, and Maxi TV in Turkey.

Beginning on August 18, 2020, the series was officially made available for streaming on YouTube without charge by Yippee TV.

The series, with the exception of the third season, and television special are also available for streaming on Hoopla. The series is also available on the Common Sense Media-owned streaming service Sensical.

References

External links

2000s American animated television series
2000s American black cartoons
2003 American television series debuts
2008 American television series endings
American children's animated action television series
American children's animated adventure television series
American children's animated comic science fiction television series
American children's animated education television series
American children's animated horror television series
American children's animated science fantasy television series
Animated television series about cats
Animated television series about children
Animated television series about orphans
Cultural depictions of Tutankhamun
Discovery Kids original programming
English-language television shows
Television series about mummies
Television series based on Egyptian mythology
Television shows set in New York City